Niphon served as Greek Patriarch of Alexandria between 1366 and 1385.

References
 

14th-century Patriarchs of Alexandria